The Chaires Community Historic District is a U.S. historic district (designated as such on December 13, 2000) located in Chaires, Florida. The district runs roughly along Chaires Cross Road, Road to the Lake, and Hancock Street. It contains 15 historic buildings.

With the exception of a brick Romanesque Revival Chaires Elementary School, the buildings in the district are of wooden vernacular construction. The school, built in 1929, was designed by Tallahassee architect Alvin R. Moore. Moore was also the architect of the Chipley City Hall, built in 1928.

References

External links

 Leon County listings at National Register of Historic Places

National Register of Historic Places in Leon County, Florida
Historic districts on the National Register of Historic Places in Florida